Our Lady of the Immaculate Conception Church, Borivali (West) has been a Roman Catholic Parish from 1547 to 1739 and again from 1912 onwards. Its present clergy are Fr Gerald Fernandes (PP), Fr Gilbert Cardoza, Fr Joel Pinto, Fr Robin Kinny and Fr Joseph David. It is situated in I.C. Colony (Immaculate Conception Colony) which is a large colony situated in the suburbs of Borivali, in the North Western face of Mumbai, Maharashtra, India.

History
The Church structure traces its origin back to the fifteenth century, a monument with an archetypal history and national significance. Adjoining the present Church building are the Mandapeshwar caves which date back to circa 750-850AD.

According to tradition, Fr Antonio do Porto, a Franciscan missionary, was the founder of this Church in 1547. By October 1548, Fr Antonio do Porto and his companion Joao de Goa had baptised a number of people and founded a ‘devout hermitage’ at Mount Poinsur.

In October 1549, the Church had the description Nossa Senhora da Piedade, i.e. Our Lady of Piety (the original name of our present Church).

During the time of Fr Antonio do Porto, the village of Mount Poinsur was granted to the Franciscan by Governor George Cabral in the name of John III, King of Portugal, for the maintenance of their work. Soon the Franciscan bought the neighbouring villages of Pare (Goregaon) and Arrangal around 1556–1559. Adjoining the Church, they also built a Royal College and Monastery in 1549, the ruins of which are still standing close to the present Church building. The College was established for the purpose of instructing those wanting to embrace the faith and training for teaching the Gospel in the local language.

The 400 Christians baptised by Fr Antonio gradually grew in number. Around 1630 there were about 1500 parishioners in the villages of Mount Poinsur, Dhainsa (Dahisar), Simpor, Canary (Kanheri) and Cassor. It was around this time that the name of the Church was changed to Our Lady of Immaculate Conception.

The Mandapeshwar caves had been used by the Franciscans as a crypt of the Church and later served as a chapel for the parishioners.

During the Maratha invasion of 1739, Mount Poinsur was captured and the Franciscans dispersed. The Church, Friary and College were pillaged and left in ruins. The following 150 years saw the already damaged structure disintegrate into further ruin.

From 1739 to 1912 it appears that there was no resident Vicar of Mt Poinsur. In 1888, through the efforts of the people of Bandra and under the guidance of the Dean of Thane, Fr Joao Braz Fernandes rebuilt the old parish Church and since then it has been functioning.

The Church had its own Vicar only from 1912 onwards and it underwent major repairs and renovations in 1912 and 1960.

The Mandapeshwar caves were taken over by the Government of India in 1969 and designated as Protected Archaeological Monuments under the Archaeological Survey of India (ASI).

In the 1980s and 1990s, the parish started expanding, initially gradually and then with increasing speed as people from the island city and southern suburbs started moving to Borivali, attracted by its peaceful surroundings and convenient public transport and other facilities. Over the last two decades till the current year, 2007, the parish has grown into one of Mumbai’s largest with a vibrant involvement in liturgical and community activities.

On the feast day at Mount Poinsur, 8 December, people from all over Mumbai come in large numbers, following a tradition passed down over the centuries that has seen this Church as a centre for pilgrimage.

References

Citations

Books 
 </ref>
 
 
 

Roman Catholic churches in Mumbai
Roman Catholic churches in Maharashtra
1547 establishments in the Portuguese Empire
Religious organizations established in the 1540s
16th-century Roman Catholic church buildings in India
Roman Catholic churches completed in the 1540s